Parques Reunidos (meaning "Reunited Parks") is an international entertainment operator based in Madrid, Spain. The group operates over 60 parks in about dozen countries. Parques Reunidos operates theme and amusement parks, zoos, water parks, family entertainment centers, and cable cars. These facilities are located in Spain, Belgium, Norway, the Netherlands, Denmark, the United Kingdom, Germany, France, Italy, the United Arab Emirates, Australia and the United States. Through acquisitions of established names such as Kennywood Entertainment Company, Dutch Wonderland and Palace Entertainment, Parques Reunidos greatly expanded its presence in American amusement operations beginning in 2007 through today. Annual visitors to the group's attractions exceed 22 million, with revenue exceeding $570 million (USD). In 2008 it had the fifth-highest attendance figures for worldwide chains with 24.9 million, ahead of SeaWorld Parks & Entertainment and Cedar Fair.

Amusement parks

Parques Reunidos currently operates 17 amusement park properties across three continents and nine countries.

Zoos, aquariums and nature parks 
Parques Reunidos currently operates 15 zoos, aquariums and nature parks across two continents and six countries.

Water parks 
Parques Reunidos currently operates 21 separately-gated water parks across three continents and eight countries.

Family Entertainment Centers 
Parques Reunidos currently operates six family entertainment enters in the United States, Spain and the United Kingdom.

Lodging and other ventures

Cable cars
The company operates one cable car in Spain.
Benalmádena

Former properties

References

 "Home". Candover. 2013-06-30. Retrieved 2013-10-23.
 "Info" (PDF). Archived from the original (PDF) on July 11, 2009. Retrieved October 13, 2009
 https://blooloop.com/link/lionsgate-international-theme-park/ March 1, 2018. Retrieved December 7, 2018

External links
 Official website
 Kennywood Connection
 Oceanarium
 Lakes Aquarium
 Blackpool Zoo

 
Companies based in Madrid
Amusement park companies
Entertainment companies established in 1967
Spanish companies established in 1967